Ralph Waldo Ince (January 16, 1887 – April 10, 1937) was an American pioneer film actor, director and screenwriter whose career began near the dawn of the silent film era. Ralph Ince was the brother of John E. Ince and Thomas H. Ince.

Biography

Ralph Ince was born in Boston, Massachusetts, the younger of three sons and a daughter raised by English immigrants, John and Emma Ince. Sometime after his birth Ince moved to Manhattan where his entire family was engaged in theater work; his father as a musical agent and mother, sister Bertha and brothers, John and Thomas as actors. Ralph Ince studied art with cartoonist Dan McCarthy and for a while worked as a newspaper cartoonist for the New York World and later magazine illustrator for the New York Mirror and The Evening Telegram. At times over his acting and directing career Ince would continue to contribute cartoons to popular magazines of the day. Early on in his career Ince, who had done some stage acting as a child, was a member of Richard Mansfield's stock company playing parts in The College Widow and Ben Hur.

Around 1906 Ince became an animator in the fledgling film industry working for Winsor McCay, but soon turned to acting and joined Vitagraph Studios where he became known for his portrayals of Abraham Lincoln in a series of one reel films. Ince began directing at Vitagraph around 1910 and was officially advanced to the director's chair in 1912, though he still continued to act in many of his films and throughout his career. Ince would go on to direct some 171 films between 1910 and 1937 and appear in approximately 110 films over nearly the same time period.

Ince became a member of The Lambs Club in 1916, and his brother John joined in 1919.

Marriage
Ince married three times, first to Vitagraph player Lucille Lee Stewart, sister of actress Anita Stewart. Their fifteen-year marriage ended in 1925, two years after she had left him. The following year he married Rosa Castro Martinez (stage name Lucille Mendez), an 18-year-old Venezuelan stage and screen actress, daughter of Venezuelan President Cipriano Castro. This union ended in 1932 after she claimed Ince damaged her career by not allowing her to accept certain job offers.  Ince's last wife was Helen Ruth Tigges, a native of Frazee, Minnesota. She was the mother of his only child, born just months before his death at age fifty.

Death
Ralph Ince died on April 10, 1937, when a car his wife was driving struck an iron standard near their residence in the Kensington district of London, England. The force of the impact, though not great, proved fatal to Ince when his head struck the dashboard. Helen Ince suffered cuts and bruises that required hospitalization. Ince and his wife had moved to Britain shortly after they had married in 1932 to continue his film work there. Ince was cremated at Golders Green.

Selected filmography

As director

 The Mills of the Gods (1912)
 My Lady's Slipper (1916)
 The Conflict (1916)
 The Co-Respondent (1917)
 Our Mrs. McChesney (1918)
 The Panther Woman (1918)
 The Eleventh Commandment (1918)
 Five Thousand an Hour (1918)
 Sealed Hearts (1919)
 The Perfect Lover (1919)
 Red Foam (1920)
 Out of the Snows (1920)
 His Wife's Money (1920)
 Tropical Love (1921)
 The Highest Law (1921)
 After Midnight (1921)
 Remorseless Love (1921)
 A Man's Home (1921)
 Wet Gold (1921)
 A Wide Open Town (1922)
 Reckless Youth (1922)
 The Referee (1922)
 Counterfeit Love (1923)
 The Chorus Lady (1924)
 The House of Youth (1924)
 The Uninvited Guest (1924)
 Lady Robinhood (1925)
 Smooth as Satin (1925)
 Alias Mary Flynn (1925)
 The Better Way (1926)
 The Lone Wolf Returns (1926)
 Breed of the Sea (1926)
 The Sea Wolf (1926)
 Bigger Than Barnum's (1926)
 Home Struck (1927)
 South Sea Love (1927)
 Shanghaied (1927)
 Enemies of Society (1927)
 Not for Publication (1927)
 Coney Island (1928)
 Chicago After Midnight (1928)
 Hit of the Show (1928)
 The Wreck of the Singapore (1928)
 Danger Street (1928)
 A Real Girl (1929)
 Hurricane (1929)
 Lucky Devils (1933)
 Murder at Monte Carlo (1934)
 A Glimpse of Paradise (1934)
 Love at Second Sight (1934)
 What's in a Name? (1934)
 No Escape (1934)
 Crime Unlimited (1935)
 Rolling Home (1935)
 The Black Mask (1935)
 Blue Smoke (1935)
 Gaol Break (1936)
 Fair Exchange (1936)
 Twelve Good Men (1936)
 Jury's Evidence (1936)
 Hail and Farewell (1936)
 It's You I Want (1936)
 The Perfect Crime (1937)
 The Vulture (1937)
 Side Street Angel (1937)

As actor

 Jean the Match-Maker (1910, Short)
 A Tale of Two Cities (1911, Short) – (uncredited)
 The Child Crusoes (1911, Short)
 The Sins of the Mothers (1914) – Mr. Raymond
 The Land of Opportunity (1920) – Abraham Lincoln
 Out of the Snows (1920) – Robert Holliday
 The Bringers (1920)
 The Highest Law (1921) – Abraham Lincoln
 The Last Door (1921)
 Wet Gold (1921) – John Cromwell
 Channing of the Northwest (1922)
 Yellow Fingers (1926) – Brute Shane
 Bigger Than Barnum's (1926) – Carl Ravelle
 The Sea Wolf (1926) – 'Wolf' Larsen
 Breed of the Sea (1926) – Tod Pembroke, aka Captain Blaze Devine
 The Better Way (1926) – Billy
 Not for Publication (1927) – 'Big Dick' Wellman
 Shanghaied (1927) – Hurricane Haley
 Chicago After Midnight (1928) – Jim Boyd
 The Wreck of the Singapore (1928) – Kelsey
 Wall Street (1929) – Roller McCray
 The Big Fight (1930) – Chuck
 Numbered Men (1930) – 33410
 Little Caesar (1931) – Pete Montana
 Gentleman's Fate (1931) – Dante
 Hell Bound (1931) – Dorgan
 The Star Witness (1931) – 'Maxey' Campo
 The Big Gamble (1931) – Webb
 The Law of the Sea (1931) – Marty Drake
 Men of Chance (1931) – Farley
 The Big Shot (1931) – Butch (uncredited)
 Girl of the Rio (1932) – O'Grady
 The Hatchet Man (1932) – 'Big Jim' Malone (uncredited)
 Law and Order (1932) – Poe Northrup
 The Lost Squadron (1932) – Jettick
 The County Fair (1932) – Diamond Barnett
 State's Attorney (1932) – Defense Attorney
 The Mouthpiece (1932) – J.B. Roscoe
 The Tenderfoot (1932) – Dolan
 Gorilla Ship (1932) – Capt. 'Gorilla' Larsen
 Guilty as Hell (1932) – Jack Reed
 The Pride of the Legion (1932) – Klafki
 Malay Nights (1932) – Jack Sheldon
 Men of America (1932) – Cicero
 Havana Widows (1933) – G.W. 'Butch' O'Neill
 Love at Second Sight (1934) – Mackintosh
 No Escape (1934) – Lucky
 So You Won't Talk (1935) – Ralph Younger
 Rolling Home (1935) – Wally
 Blue Smoke (1935) – Al Dempson
 Gaol Break (1936) – Jim Oakley
 The Perfect Crime (1937) – Jim Lanahan

References

External links

1887 births
1937 deaths
Road incident deaths in London
American film directors
American male film actors
American people of English descent
American male silent film actors
American male screenwriters
Male actors from Boston
Screenwriters from Massachusetts
20th-century American male actors
20th-century American male writers
20th-century American screenwriters
Members of The Lambs Club